Vassy may refer to:

Vassy, Calvados, a former commune in Valdallière, Calvados département, Normandy region, France
Vassy-sous-Pisy, formerly Vassy, a commune in the Yonne département, France 
Vassy (singer) (born 1983), Australian singer, songwriter, and producer
Vassy Kapelos (born 1981), Canadian political journalist
Kin Vassy (1943–1994), American singer-songwriter

See also
 Wassy, formerly Wassy-sur-Blaise, a commune in Haute-Marne, France